Vazhachal Falls is situated in Athirappilly Panchayath of Thrissur district in Kerala on the southwest coast of India. Located on the west-flowing Chalakudy River near the Vazhachal Forest Division and at the edge of the Sholayar ranges, it is just 5 km from entrance of Athirappilly Falls. It is located 36 km from Chalakudy.

See also
 Athirappilly Falls
 Charpa Falls
 Chalakudy
 List of waterfalls in India
 List of waterfalls in India by height

References

External links

 

Waterfalls of Thrissur district